Biathlon at the 2014 Winter Paralympics was held at the Laura Biathlon & Ski Complex near Krasnaya Polyana, Russia. The eighteen events took place on 8, 11, and 14 March 2014.

Events
The program included 6 event types (3 for men and 3 for women) that were divided into three classifications each (sitting, standing, and visually impaired), for a total of 18 events. Standing biathletes are those that have a locomotive disability but are able to use the same equipment as able-bodied skiers, whereas sitting competitors use a sitski. Skiers with a visual impairment compete with the help of a sighted guide and an acoustic aiming system. The skier with the visual impairment and the guide are considered a team, and dual medals are awarded.

Men's events
 7.5 km
 12.5 km
 15 km
Women's events
 6 km
 10 km
 12.5 km

Competition schedule
The following is the competition schedule for all events.

All times are (UTC+4).

Medal summary

Medal table

Women's events

Men's events

See also
Biathlon at the 2014 Winter Olympics

References

 
2014 Winter Paralympics events
Winter Paralympics
2014
Biathlon competitions in Russia